Redox is a Unix-like microkernel operating system written in the programming language Rust, which has a focus on safety, stability, and performance. Redox aims to be secure, usable, and free. Redox is inspired by prior kernels and operating systems, such as SeL4, MINIX, Plan 9, and BSD. It is similar to GNU and BSD, but is written in a memory-safe language. It is free and open-source software distributed under an MIT License.

Redox gets its name from the reduction-oxidation reactions in chemistry; one redox reaction is the corrosion of iron, also called rust.

Design 
The Redox operating system is designed to be secure. This is reflected in two design decisions:
 Using the programming language Rust for implementation
 Using a microkernel design, similar to MINIX

Components 
Redox provides packages (memory allocator, file system, display manager, core utilities, etc.) that together make up a functional operating system. Redox relies on an ecosystem of software written in Rust by members of the project.

 Redox kernel – derives from the concept of microkernels, with inspiration from MINIX
 Ralloc – memory allocator
 TFS file system – inspired by the ZFS file system
 Ion shell – the underlying library for shells and command execution in Redox, and the default shell
 pkgutils – package manager
 Orbital windowing system – display and window manager, sets up the orbital: scheme, manages the display, and handles requests for window creation, redraws, and event polling
 relibc – C standard library

Command-line applications 
Redox supports command-line interface (CLI) programs, including:
 Sodium – vi-like editor that provides syntax highlighting
 Rusthello – advanced Reversi AI; is highly concurrent, serving as proof of Redox's multithreading abilities; supports various AI strategies, such as brute forcing, minimax, local optimizations, and hybrid AIs

Graphical applications 
Redox supports graphical user interface (GUI) programs, including:
 NetSurf – a lightweight web browser which uses its own layout engine
 Calculator – a software calculator which provides functions similar to the Windows Calculator program
 Editor – simple text editor, similar to Microsoft Notepad
 File Browser – a file manager that displays icons, names, sizes, and details for files; uses the launcher command to open files when they are clicked
 Image Viewer – Image viewer for simple file types
 Pixelcannon – 3D renderer, can be used to benchmark the Orbital desktop
 Orbterm – ANSI type terminal emulator

History 
Redox was created by Jeremy Soller and was first published on 20 April 2015 on GitHub. As of July 2021, the Redox repository had a total of 79 contributors.

References

External links
 
 Official GitLab instance
 
 

Free software operating systems
Free software programmed in Rust
Hobbyist operating systems
Microkernel-based operating systems
Software using the MIT license
Unix variants